Kang Shin-Hyo (born August 13, 1989) is a South Korean actor. Kang was studying acting in classes run by director Shin Yeon-Shik, when Shin cast him in the leading role of his independent film, The Russian Novel (2013).

Filmography

Films

Television series

Discography

Singles

Musical theatre

Awards and nominations

References

External links 
  
 
 
 

1989 births
Living people
South Korean male film actors
South Korean male television actors
South Korean male musical theatre actors